The North Tarrant Express (NTE) project is a total highway reconstruction of the Interstate 820 (I-820) and State Highway 121/State Highway 183 (SH 121/SH 183, Airport Freeway) corridor between I-35W and Industrial Boulevard in Northeast Tarrant County, Texas. The NTE and the Texas Department of Transportation (TxDOT) anticipate the new highway system will relieve traffic congestion, improve safety on its roadways and have integrated plans for the anticipated traffic growth in one of the country’s fastest developing regions.

Construction began in late 2010 and was scheduled to be completed before the end of 2014, at least six months ahead of schedule.

The project will provide over $1.5 billion of needed infrastructure to the Fort Worth area.

The NTE project is completely reconstructing and upgrading existing general highway lanes. It is also improving and expanding frontage lanes to double the existing capacity. Moreover, adding TEXpress managed lanes, or tolled express lanes, is designed for commuters seeking the most reliable and time-saving trip. The variable tolls are based on travel time with a minimum goal to maintain a 50 mph traffic flow on the highway; motorists can choose to use general highway lanes or tolled express lanes depending on their traveling objectives.

History
A study by the free-market Reason Foundation in 2009 that focused on 11 metro areas, showed that North Texas would have a huge economic boost by alleviating traffic congestion, calculating the extra productivity from better movement of people and goods around the region. Wise infrastructure investments that eliminate gridlock and produce free-flowing road conditions will more than pay for themselves by boosting the region’s economy, and thus tax revenues to maintain the mobility.

The Dallas–Fort Worth metroplex (DFW) was singled out in the study due to its poor showing in congestion indexes and ranked poorly in many indexes in the annual mobility study by the Texas Transportation Institute. The Reason study says the biggest economic gains would come from eliminating severe congestion, which could add $46 billion a year to the regional economy and over $3 billion in annual tax revenues. Dallas is the fourth fastest-growing city in the country.

For the 150,000+ cars a day that travel through the I-820 and SH 121/SR 183 corridor, drivers are no stranger to some of the bottlenecks that cause these delays. As one of the region's most important corridors, this stretch of highway has not kept up with the growth and North Texas' nearly seven million residents. Dallas/Fort Worth commuters spend an average of two days a year stuck in traffic—the fifth-highest in the nation.

On January 29, 2009, the Texas Transportation Commission voted 5–0 to hire Cintra's NTE Mobility Partners to rebuild phase 1 of North Tarrant Express corridors.

Route description

NTE Project (1 & 2W)
On June 23, 2009, TxDOT awarded a comprehensive development agreement (CDA) for the North Tarrant Express project to NTE Mobility Partners. This concessions includes the design, development, construction, finance, maintenance, and operation of Segment 1 (West) and Segment 2 (East) for the duration of 52 years.

West Segment

This segment includes 9 cross-street bridges and 21 on-ramps/off-ramps.

East Segment

This segment includes 9 cross-street bridges and 31 on- or off-ramps).

I-35W Project
A construction agreement with TxDOT has initiated construction on Segments 3A (I-35W from downtown Fort Worth) & 3B (I-35W from I-30 to U.S. 287). Segment 3A has an expected completion date in 2018 and 3B in 2017. The I-35W project is the next part of the North Tarrant Express. It is divided into three segments:

Constructed by NTE Mobility Partners Segments 3, LLC (NTEMP3).
Constructed by TxDOT.
Segment 3C is from US 81 and 287 to Eagle Parkway. Construction began in September 2020. The public-private project will rebuild 6.7 miles of I-35W and add four TEXpress Lanes, auxiliary lanes and some frontage roads. Anticipated substantial completion is late 2023.

Partners
The North Tarrant Express is a collaboration of private and public partners (P3 or PPP), including TxDOT and the North Central Texas Council of Governments (NCTCOG).

The NTE is being designed, built, financed, operated and maintained by NTE Mobility Partners, which is working in close collaboration with TxDOT and local communities. This important highway project will be wholly owned by TxDOT.

Pursuant to the additional agreement between TxDOT and NTE Mobility Partners Segments 3 LLC (NTEMP3), the developer (NTEMP3) will design, build, operate and maintain segment 3A (35W). TxDOT will build segment 3B (35W), from north of Loop 820 to U.S. 287, and will then turn it over to NTEMP3 who will be responsible for the operations and maintenance. NTEMP3 will also collect tolls generated on the managed toll lanes of the facility until 2061 paying off the PAB's, TIFIA loan, private equity partners and then sharing profits with TxDOT.

Developer

NTE Mobility Partners LLC is a company with three shareholders, including Cintra, a world leader in private-sector development of transportation infrastructure; Meridiam, a global public-private partnership investor/developer of public facilities; and the Dallas Police and Fire Pension System, the first U.S. pension fund in the country to invest in the building and maintenance of a major toll road project like NTE.

Exit list

See also

References

External links

 North Tarrant Express
 NTE TEXpress Lanes
 Drive On TEXpress App

Toll roads in Texas
Transportation in Tarrant County, Texas